Pease Pottage services is a motorway service station at Junction 11 of the M23 motorway near Crawley. It is owned by Moto.

Facilities
Facilities on the site include M&S Foodhall and WHSmith. 
Burger King, Costa Coffee (with Costa Express), Greggs, Krispy Kreme & The West Cornwall Pasty Company all have outlets. Also free WiFi is offered on the site for all, there are a few gambling machines in a separate area and toilets.

Artwork
The service station is one of fourteen with a large mural by David Fisher in the 1990s, designed to reflect the local area and history.

References

External links 
Moto official website — Pease Pottage
Motorway Services Online — Pease Pottage

Year of establishment missing
Moto motorway service stations
Buildings and structures in West Sussex
Transport in West Sussex
Mid Sussex District